Gudihatnur is a mandal in Adilabad district of the Indian state of Telangana. It is located in Gudihatnur mandal of Adilabad revenue division.

Geography

References

External links
Adilabad Mandals and their Gram Panchayats (map)

Villages in Adilabad district